This is a list of notable California suffragists who were politically active before and during the successful Proposition 4 in 1911 which gave women won the right to vote.

Groups 

 California Equal Suffrage Association
 California Political Equality League
 California Woman Suffrage Society 
Congressional Union for Women Suffrage
Fannie Jackson Coppin Club
National American Woman Suffrage Association
National Woman's Party
Political Equality Club of Alameda
Votes for Women Club
Women's Christian Temperance Union
Woman's Club of Palo Alto
Young Women's Suffrage Club

Early 19th century suffragists 

Anna Dickinson
Laura de Force Gordon 
Georgiana Bruce Kirby 
Emily Pitts Stevens
Ellen Clark Sargent
Elizabeth Lowe Watson

Suffragists in the 1896 campaign

Suffragists in the 1911 campaign

Suffragists who campaigned in California 
Lucy Anthony 
Susan B. Anthony
Carrie Chapman Catt
Abigail Scott Duniway
Julia Ward Howe
Florence Kelley
Anne Henrietta Martin
Anna Howard Shaw
Sylvia Pankhurst
Helen Todd

See also 

 Timeline of women's suffrage in California
 Women's suffrage in California
 Women's suffrage in states of the United States
 Women's suffrage in the United States

References 

Feminism in California
Feminism and history
California suffrage

Activists from California
suffragists
History of women in California